The 1910 Rutgers Queensmen football team represented Rutgers University as an independent during the 1910 college football season. In their first season under head coach Howard Gargan, the Queensmen compiled a 3–2–3 record and outscored their opponents, 59 to 33. The team captain was Howard A. Smith.

Schedule

References

Rutgers
Rutgers Scarlet Knights football seasons
Rutgers Queensmen football